Lac de la Haute-Sûre, is a commune, in the canton of Wiltz in north-western Luxembourg. The commune is named after the Upper Sûre Lake, a reservoir on the upper Sauer river.  The commune's administrative centre is Bavigne.

Lac de la Haute-Sûre was formed on 1 January 1979 from the former communes of Harlange and Mecher, both in Wiltz canton.  The law creating Lac de la Haute-Sûre was passed on 23 December 1978.

Populated places
The commune consists of the following villages:

 Harlange Section:
 Harlange
 Tarchamps
 Watrange

 Mecher Section:
 Bavigne
 Kaundorf
 Liefrange
 Mecher
 Nothum
 Dénkert (Dünkrodt) (lieu-dit)
 Schumannseck (lieu-dit)

Population

References

External links
 

 
Towns in Luxembourg
Communes in Wiltz (canton)